Thandalai is a village in the Udayarpalayam taluk of Ariyalur district, Tamil Nadu, India.
Government higher secondary school is located in Thandalai village.

Demographics 

As per the 2001 census, Thandalai had a total population of 5310 with 2729 males and 2581 females.

References 

Villages in Ariyalur district